Babu Singh may refer to:

 Babu Singh, politician from Rajasthan
 Babu Singh Maan, Punjabi songwriter/lyricist
 Babu Singh Kushwaha, politician from Uttar Pradesh